The microbial food web refers to the combined trophic interactions among microbes in aquatic environments. These microbes include viruses, bacteria, algae, heterotrophic protists (such as ciliates and flagellates).

In aquatic environments, microbes constitute the base of the food web. Single celled photosynthetic organisms such as diatoms and cyanobacteria are generally the most important primary producers in the open ocean. Many of these cells, especially cyanobacteria, are too small to be captured and consumed by small crustaceans and planktonic larvae. Instead, these cells are consumed by phagotrophic protists which are readily consumed by larger organisms. Viruses can infect and break open bacterial cells and (to a lesser extent), planktonic algae (a.k.a. phytoplankton). Therefore, viruses in the microbial food web act to reduce the population of bacteria and, by lysing bacterial cells, release particulate and dissolved organic carbon (DOC). DOC may also be released into the environment by algal cells. One of the reasons phytoplankton release DOC termed "unbalanced growth" is when essential nutrients (e.g. nitrogen and phosphorus) are limiting. Therefore, carbon produced during photosynthesis is not used for the synthesis of proteins (and subsequent cell growth), but is limited due of a lack of the nutrients necessary for macromolecules. Excess photosynthate, or DOC is then released, or exuded.

The microbial loop describes a pathway in the microbial food web where DOC is returned to higher trophic levels via the incorporation into bacterial biomass.

See also

 Microbial cooperation
 Microbial intelligence
 Microbial population biology

References

Other references
 Michaels, A.F. and Silver, M.W. (1988) "Primary production, sinking fluxes and the microbial food web". Deep Sea Research Part A. Oceanographic Research Papers, 35(4): 473–90. 

Microbiology